Ambrosia is an unincorporated community in Mason County, West Virginia, United States.

References 

Unincorporated communities in West Virginia
Unincorporated communities in Mason County, West Virginia
Populated places on the Kanawha River